1999 Denmark Open is a professional dart's tournament, which took place in Denmark in 1999.

Results

References

1999 in darts
1999 in Danish sport
Darts in Denmark